Ralls High School is a public high school located in Ralls, Texas (USA) and classified as a 2A school by the UIL. It is part of the Ralls Independent School District located in Crosby County. In 2015, the school was rated "Met Standard" by the Texas Education Agency.

Athletics
The Ralls Jackrabbits compete in the following sports:

 Baseball
 Basketball
 Cross Country
 Football
 Golf
 Powerlifting
 Softball
 Tennis
 Track & Field

References

External links
Official Website

Public high schools in Texas
Education in Crosby County, Texas